Sonny Stitt at the D. J. Lounge is a live album by saxophonist Sonny Stitt recorded in Chicago in 1961 and released on the Argo label.

Reception
The Allmusic site awarded the album 4 stars stating "Their renditions of a few standards and some riffing blues are spirited if not all that essential".

Track listing 
All compositions by Sonny Stitt except as indicated
 "McKie's" - 9:38     
 "It All Depends on You" (Lew Brown, Buddy DeSylva, Ray Henderson) - 5:58     
 "Blue Moon" (Lorenz Hart, Richard Rodgers) - 5:55     
 "Jay Tee" - 6:21     
 "I'm in the Mood for Love" (Dorothy Fields, Jimmy McHugh) - 4:43     
 "Free Chicken" - 10:01

Personnel 
Sonny Stitt - alto saxophone, tenor saxophone
John Board - tenor saxophone
Edward Buster - organ  
Arthur Harper - bass
Joe Shelton - drums

References 

1961 live albums
Argo Records live albums
Sonny Stitt live albums